The Eurotunnel Class 9 or Class 9000 are six-axle high-power Bo′Bo′Bo′ single-ended electric locomotives built by the Euroshuttle Locomotive Consortium (ESCL) of Brush Traction and ABB. The class was designed for and is used exclusively to haul the Le Shuttle road vehicle services through the Channel Tunnel.

Background and design
Tendering for the locomotive procurement began in 1989. The operating concession agreement between Transmanche Link/Eurotunnel and the British and French governments required that there be a locomotive on either end of the train, allowing splitting and reversing of the train.

The French railway lobby was suggesting using three four-axle Bo′Bo′ locomotives (such as the SNCF BB 26000). ESCL proposed a six-axle Bo′Bo′Bo′ locomotive derived from the narrow-gauge EF class locomotives supplied by Brush Traction to the New Zealand Railways Corporation and won the contract with an initial order of 40 in July 1989.

The main traction electrical system consists of: two pantographs (duplicated for redundancy) collecting a 25 kV AC supply which feeds the main transformer, with separate output windings rectified to a DC link (one per bogie) using four quadrant converters. The direct current drives a three-phase inverter, which powers two asynchronous three-phase induction motors. There are two additional output windings on the transformer for the locomotive's auxiliaries and to supply power to the train vehicles.

The bogies were a fabricated steel design, with coil spring primary suspension. The traction motors and gearboxes (one per axle) were mounted to the bogie frame and connected to the wheels by a flexibly coupled quill drive. The locomotive superstructure is supported on coil springs on a central swing bolster, and the centre bogie allows  of lateral movement to negotiate small-radius curves. Yaw dampers are also fitted.

The locomotive superstructure is a stressed-skin monocoque design.

The driver's cab and exterior design of the locomotives was undertaken by DCA Design, Warwick, UK. Side windows in the locomotive cab are omitted to prevent 'segment flicker' caused by fast running in the tunnel, a potential distraction and cause of driver drowsiness. The driving position was air conditioned and pressurised, and incorporated in-cab TVM 430 signalling. The driving cab also incorporates train manager's facilities, including safety systems such as CCTV, alarms and communication links. There is a second driving position for shunting at the rear of the locomotive.

Testing and operations
The initial order for 40 units was reduced to 38, numbered 9001 to 9038. The first locomotive was completed in 1992, and two units (9003 and 9004) were tested at the Velim test track in the Czech Republic. Locomotive 9004 started its required 50,000-kilometre endurance test at Velim on 17 August 1993 and finished it on 23 September 1993.

The locomotives are maintained at the Eurotunnel depot located just beside Eurotunnel Calais Terminal at Coquelles near Calais, France.

The formal opening took place on 6 May 1994 with Queen Elizabeth II and François Mitterrand travelling on a shuttle through the tunnel.

The 1996 Channel Tunnel fire damaged locomotive 9030 beyond repair.

Later subclasses

9100 subseries
In 1997, Eurotunnel ordered five more locomotives and in 1998 the order was increased to a total of 14. This second batch of locomotives also had small improvements compared to the originals, including IGBT-based traction inverters instead of GTO-based and one inverter per motor instead of one per bogie.

This second batch of locomotives is numbered in the 9100 series (9101 to 9113) except for one locomotive, 9040 which was purchased as a replacement for 9030, the locomotive destroyed in the 1996 fire.

9700 subseries
This third batch of locomotives is numbered in the 9700 series (9701 to 9707) and deliveries ended in 2003. These more powerful locomotives are used to pull the freight truck shuttles, which were able to be increased in length.

9800 subseries

These rebuilt locomotives are numbered in the 9800 series.

By 2018 of the 57 locomotives, 44 of them had been upgraded to the  version, while the remaining 13 still have the original  power.

Names

After introduction the locomotives were named after opera singers. In 1997 four units were named Jungfraujoch, Lötschberg, Gotthard and Furkatunnel, after Swiss rail tunnels.

List of Named locomotives:

Notes

References

Sources

Literature

Further reading

External links

9
Bo′Bo′Bo′ locomotives
Bo-Bo-Bo locomotives
Brush Traction locomotives
Channel Tunnel
Railway locomotives introduced in 1992
Standard gauge locomotives of Great Britain
Standard gauge electric locomotives of France